Dviete Parish is an administrative unit of Augšdaugava Municipality in the Selonia region of Latvia (Prior to the 2009 administrative reforms it was part of Daugavpils District).

Towns, villages and settlements of Dviete Parish 
 Dviete

References 

Parishes of Latvia
Augšdaugava Municipality
Selonia